Mike Kirkland (born August 1, 1947) is a Kenyan former rally driver from Nairobi, known for his appearances in the World Rally Championship.

External links 
 Driver profile, ewrc-results.com

1947 births
Living people
Kenyan rally drivers
Nismo drivers
World Rally Championship drivers